Wilhelm Jobst (October 27, 1912 – May 28, 1947), aka Willi Jobst and Willibald Jobst, was a German physician and convicted Nazi war criminal who held the rank of SS  as a concentration camp doctor.

Nazi Germany

Jobst came from a German family living in Czech Sudetenland which was ultimately annexed through the Munich Agreement by the Third Reich in September 1938. He was then transferred, and was initially employed as a camp doctor at the Gross-Rosen concentration camp until 1942 when he was moved to the Sachsenhausen concentration camp. From May 1944 to April 1945 Jobst additionally worked at the Ebensee and Mauthausen concentration camp.

Post-war
After World War II ended, Jobst was among 61 other defendants in the first Mauthausen-Gusen camp trial. Jobst was accused of giving injections to terminally ill prisoners in his capacity as camp doctor in Ebensee from 1944 to 1945. Witnesses also accused him of having tolerated the beating of sick inmates by the Kapo, and of having hit and kicked these inmates himself. Other accusations included neglecting the medical care of inmates in Ebensee. The arrival of a transport consisting of 1,000 to 1,500 prisoners from Silesia in February 1945 was of particular importance in this regard, as 200 are said to have died within a short time. Jobst denied having selected sick prisoners for injections saying he did what was within his means to ensure the care of the camp inmates. He attributed the death rate of the inmates to their poor state of health before they arrived at the camp. The US military court did not believe his story, and Jobst was found guilty of ill-treatment, torture and murder of prisoners in his capacity. He was sentenced to death by hanging on May 13, 1946, and executed on May 28, 1947 in Landsberg Prison.

See also
List of Nazi doctors

References

Further reading
 Case No. 000-50-5 (US vs. Hans Altfuldisch et al.) Tried 13 May 46 (PDF File, 75.2 MB)
 : Cement work camp : the Ebensee concentration camp and rocket armament. - Publisher for social criticism, Vienna, 1989. ISBN 3-900351-86-4
 Florian Freund: The Ebensee concentration camp - rocket armor in the SS work camp "Cement" - Studien-Verlag, Innsbruck, 2008? ISBN 3-7065-5000-8, neue ISBN 978-3-7065-4186-2
 Ernst Klee: The Person Encyclopedia of the Third Reich - Fischer paperback publishing house, Frankfurt am Main, 2005. ISBN 3-596-16048-0

1912 births
1947 deaths
Nazi Party members
SS-Hauptsturmführer
Physicians in the Nazi Party
Mauthausen concentration camp personnel
Mauthausen Trial executions